The Kazakhstan national handball team is the national handball team of Kazakhstan.

Asian Championship record
1993 – 11th place
1995 – 8th place

Olympic
 Handball at the 2012 Summer Olympics – Men's qualification

23.10 18:20 Oman 41-27 Kazakhstan

24.10 19:00 South Korea 41-15 Kazakhstan

27.10 19:00 China 38-16 Kazakhstan

29.10 15:00 Japan 46-15 Kazakhstan

Source:

References

External links
IHF profile

Men's national handball teams
National sports teams of Kazakhstan